In aviation, a bounced landing is a behavior of an aircraft that can develop after aircraft touching the runway or water surface, and defined as all aircraft wheels or floats briefly and sometimes repeatedly losing contact with the runway or water surface during landing. It should not be confused with aquaplaning or a touch-and-go landing.

Types of bounced landing 
Overspeed bounced landing (speed-induced bounced landing) - happens due occurrence of ground effect on wings as aircraft approach landing surface at speeds exceeding normal landing speed by 10% or more.
Ballooning (pitch-induced bounced landing) - happens due combination of pitch motion during touchdown and elastic reactions of chassis struts. Can be induced by pilot inputs or ground roughness, and can happen even at normal landing speed.
Porpoising (runaway bounced landing) - repeated bouncing with bouncing amplitude increasing with each touchdown. This is most dangerous bounced landing type typically resulting in severe damage or destruction of airframe.

Factors favouring bounced landing
 Excessive airspeed at landing
 Inexperienced pilot
 Attitude errors before landing (especially excessive nose-down attitude resulting in high sink rate)
 Rough landing strip
 Attempts to fix the excessive sink rate in last moments before landing
 Nose-wheel aircraft
 Cross-winds

Bounced landing mitigation procedures 
In general, once touched down the bounced landing mitigation procedures are ineffective, especially for inexperienced pilots. Therefore, if some factors in control of pilot are favouring bounced landing, it is recommended to perform Go-around or Touch-and-go landing whenever possible, before development of usually fatal runaway bouncing occurs. Then try to remove the hazardous factors, and land again.

If the initial bouncing have occurred, but aircraft horizontal speed is insufficient for Touch-and-go landing, the following emergency procedure should be followed:
 In case of initial bouncing, never try to apply full nose-down input, especially on aircraft with the nose-wheel. Landing nose-down is sure way to develop runaway bouncing and to break nose-wheel struts. Instead, gently stabilize pitch attitude at around normal landing angle, and wait until next touchdown. It is permitted to reduce vertical speed prior to second touchdown by slight nose-up input.
In general, pitch-induced bounced landing is much easier to mitigate compared to speed-induced bounced landing, due aircraft lower lift and kinetic energy. Make an effort to shed an excess horizontal speed whenever possible.
The runaway bounced landing (with at least 2 bounces after initial touchdown) is usually not recoverable. Some military aircraft may deploy drogue parachute to arrest runaway bouncing though.

Notable occurrences of bounced landing
Aeroflot Flight 1492
Garuda Indonesia Flight 200
FedEx Express Flight 80

See also
Fuel dumping
Missed approach
Touch-and-go landing

References

Emergency aircraft operations
Aviation safety